Charles Geoghegan House is a historic home located at Huntington Bay in Suffolk County, New York. It was built in 1915 and is a large, -story, eight bay, clapboard and shingle-sheathed gable-roofed residence in the Shingle Style.  Also on the property is the building containing the original garage / servant's quarters.

It was added to the National Register of Historic Places in 1985.

References

Houses on the National Register of Historic Places in New York (state)
Queen Anne architecture in New York (state)
Houses completed in 1915
Shingle Style houses
Houses in Suffolk County, New York
National Register of Historic Places in Suffolk County, New York
Shingle Style architecture in New York (state)